Garfield Historic District may refer to:

Garfield Historic District (Phoenix), Arizona, National Register of Historic Places listings in Phoenix, Arizona
Garfield Street Historic District, Cambridge, Massachusetts
Garfield Historic District (Poplar Bluff, Missouri), National Register of Historic Places listings in Butler County, Missouri
Garfield Place Historic District, Poughkeepsie, New York

See also
Garfield House (disambiguation)
Garfield Building (disambiguation)
Garfield Park (disambiguation)
Garfield Library (disambiguation)
Garfield School (disambiguation)